Michael McNamara may refer to:

Michael McNamara (footballer), Irish footballer from Sligo
Michael McNamara (politician) (born 1974), Irish Labour Party/Independent politician for Clare
Michael McNamara (Medal of Honor) (1839–1907), U.S. Marine and Medal of Honor recipient
Mike McNamara (born 1949), Irish hurling manager
Mike McNamara (ice hockey) (born 1949), Canadian ice hockey defenceman

See also
Michael MacNamara (died 1767), politician in colonial Maryland, mayor of Annapolis